Boswellia serrata is a plant that produces Indian frankincense. The plant is native to much of India and the Punjab region that extends into Pakistan.

Sustainability
Boswellia serrata is currently at risk of being eradicated because of non-sustainable practices.

Research 
Boswellia serrata contains various derivatives of boswellic acid including β-boswellic acid, acetyl-β-boswellic acid, 11-keto-β-boswellic acid and acetyl-11-keto-β-boswellic acid.

Extracts of Boswellia serrata have been clinically studied for osteoarthritis and joint function, with the research showing trends of benefit (slight improvement) in pain and function.

Gallery

References 

serrata
Plants used in Ayurveda
Flora of India (region)
Flora of Pakistan
Incense material
Resins
Plants described in 1807
Taxa named by Jules Émile Planchon